Morawica may refer to:

Morawica, Lesser Poland Voivodeship, Poland
Morawica, Świętokrzyskie Voivodeship, Poland
Gmina Morawica, an administrative district in Kielce County, Świętokrzyskie Voivodeship, Poland

See also
Moravița
Moravice (disambiguation)
Moravec (disambiguation)
Morawitz